The Third Ministry of Machine Building of the People's Republic of China was a former government ministry of China, which oversaw the aviation industry.

The Ministry was established in April 1955. After the Cultural Revolution, the first information about its business comes from March 1973. Under this name he was known to the ministry in May 1982. In April 1988 it became part of the newly created Ministry of Aerospace Industry.

At the close cooperation with the Soviet Union ministry was responsible for launching the production supplied by Soviet fighters F-2 (MiG-15), J-4 (MiG-17), JS (MiG-17PF) and J-6 (MiG-19) and bombers, H-5 (Il-28) and H-6 (Tu-16). Also launched its own production of J-7 fighter (MiG-21).

Modern aircraft factories in: Shenyang (J-4, J-5, J-6, J-7, J-8, J-11), Xi'an (H-6, H-8), Harbin (H-5) and Chengdu (J-7).

See also
First Ministry of Machine-Building of the PRC
Second Ministry of Machine-Building of the PRC, ministry of nuclear industry
Fourth Ministry of Machine-Building of the PRC, ministry of electronics industry
Fifth Ministry of Machine-Building of the PRC, ministry of tank equipment and artillery
Sixth Ministry of Machine-Building of the PRC, ministry of shipbuilding
Seventh Ministry of Machine-Building of the PRC, ministry of space industry
Eighth Ministry of Machine-Building of the PRC

Bibliography 
 Malcolm Lamb: Directory of officials and Organizations in China, ME Sharpe Inc. Armonk, NY, 2003, p. 1911 +, Volume 1
 China's Economic System, Routledge Abingdon 2005, 594 p., 

Government ministries of the People's Republic of China
Government agencies established in 1955
1955 establishments in China